Too Many Parents is a 1936 American comedy film directed by Robert F. McGowan, written by Virginia Van Upp and Doris Malloy, and starring Frances Farmer, Lester Matthews, Porter Hall, Henry Travers, Billy Lee, George Ernest and Sherwood Bailey. It was released on March 30, 1936, by Paramount Pictures.

Plot

Cast
Frances Farmer as Sally Colman
Lester Matthews as Mark Stewart
Porter Hall as Mrs. Saunders
Henry Travers as Wilkins
Billy Lee as Billy Miller
George Ernest as Phillip Stewart
Sherwood Bailey as Clarence Talbot Jr.
Douglas Scott as Morton Downing
Colin Tapley as Miller
Buster Phelps as Clinton Meadows
Howard C. Hickman as Colonel Colman
Sylvia Breamer as Malloy
 Ann Evers as Clara
Doris Lloyd as Mrs. Downing
Lois Kent as Morton's Sister
Jonathan Hale as Judge
Carl Switzer as Kid Singer
Anne Grey as Miss Allison
Henry Roquemore as Belcher
Cal Tjader as Alfred

References

External links 
 

1936 films
American comedy films
1936 comedy films
Paramount Pictures films
Films directed by Robert F. McGowan
American black-and-white films
Films set in boarding schools
1930s English-language films
1930s American films